Hillway is a settlement on the Isle of Wight, off the south coast of England.

The hamlet lies near to the south-east coast of the island, and is located near to the larger settlement of Bembridge (where the 2011 Census population is included).

Villages on the Isle of Wight
Bembridge